The 64th Brigade was a formation of  the British Army. It was raised as part of the new army also known as Kitchener's Army and assigned to the 21st Division and served on the Western Front during the First World War.

Formation
The infantry battalions did not all serve at once, but all were assigned to the brigade during the war.

9th Battalion, King's Own Yorkshire Light Infantry
10th Battalion, King's Own Yorkshire Light Infantry
14th Battalion, Durham Light Infantry
15th Battalion, Durham Light Infantry
1st Battalion, East Yorkshire Regiment
2nd Battalion, South Lancashire Regiment 	
64th Machine Gun Company
64th Trench Mortar Battery

References

Infantry brigades of the British Army in World War I